Grünbach is a municipality in the Vogtlandkreis district, in Saxony, Germany.

Population development
Historical population (31 December):

References 

Municipalities in Saxony
Vogtlandkreis